Tropical Storm Tess known in the Philippines as Tropical Storm Welpring was the second of three tropical cyclones to directly impact the Philippines in a two-week time frame in 1988. An area of disturbed weather near the Philippines was first observed on November 1. Following an increase in organization, the disturbance was designated as a tropical cyclone on November 4. Moving west, Tess steadily strengthened due to favorable conditions aloft. Rapid weakening then ensured as Tess neared Vietnam, and after making landfall in the country on November 6, Tess dissipated the next day.

Tropical Storm Tess and its precursor disturbance brought extensive flooding to much of the central Philippines. In Cebu, eight people were killed, and many homes and bridges were destroyed. The province of Palawan, a geographically isolated island from the rest of the country, suffered severe damage due to mudslides and flooding. There, 75 people were confirmed to have died, and 600 others were later presumed to have perished. In the suburbs of the capital city of Manila, 3,000 people were forced to flee their homes due to rising floodwaters. In all, there were a total of 686 deaths in the country. Nationwide, 144,136 people were evacuated to shelter, and 86 homes were destroyed, with 430 others receiving damage. Damage in the country totaled $11.38 million (1988 USD). In addition to the impact on the Philippines, Tess killed 37 people and inflicted $11 million in damage in Vietnam.

Meteorological history

In what would later become the second of two tropical cyclones to form within the basin during November 1988, an area of disturbed weather was first noted by the Joint Typhoon Warning Center (JTWC) early on November 1. Six hours later, the Japan Meteorological Agency (JMA) started following the system. The same day, the Philippine Atmospheric, Geophysical and Astronomical Services Administration also started to track the storm and assigned it with the local name Welpring.
Over the next three days, the disturbance tracked southwest while embedded within the northeasterly flow of the winter monsoon. After passing through the Visayas island group and emerging into the open water of the Sulu Sea, the system began to increase in organization. At 17:30 UTC on November 3, the JTWC issued a Tropical Cyclone Formation Alert.

Almost immediately after the upgrades, the storm's track shifted from southwestward to westward in response to a trough weakening to the north; this also weakened the pressure gradient between the trough and a nearby ridge starting on November 4. In turn, wind shear decreased and allowed the storm to intensify. Following an increase in satellite intensity estimates, the JTWC upgraded the depression into a tropical storm, and named it Tess, at 06:00 UTC. As the storm tracked over the South China Sea, strengthening continued. On November 5, the JMA upgraded Tess into a severe tropical storm. Data from the JTWC suggests the storm weakened rapidly as it approached Vietnam. At 00:00 UTC on November 6, the JTWC stopped tracking the system; however, intensity estimates from the JMA had only decreased slightly during this time, and continued to classify Tess as a severe tropical storm. By early November 7, the JMA stopped tracking the system.

Impact and aftermath
By moving across the central Philippines in its formative phases, Tess became the second tropical cyclone to impact the island group within two weeks; the first was Typhoon Ruby. At least nine people were killed in the provinces of Cebu and Bukidnon, where the storm also rendered 600 people homeless. Eight of those deaths occurred in Cebu. There, the storm brought flash flooding that destroyed numerous bridges and homes. Palawan Island, a rugged, sparsely populated island chain isolated from the rest of the country, sustained widespread destruction from Tess, primarily due to flooding and landslides. On the island, the town of Rizal sustained the worst damage from the storm. There, 23 fatalities occurred. By November 10, 75 people were confirmed to have been killed throughout Palawan, with 600 others subsequently listed as missing by the Philippine Red Cross. The missing were presumed dead by December 14. This forced 3,000 people, mainly in the suburbs of Pasig, Taguig and Pateros, to evacuate their homes. Outside Palawan Island, Tess only resulted in 11 fatalities only in the island chain, all due to flooding.

Nationwide, the storm was blamed for 686 deaths. Additionally, 144,136 people or 28,824 families were evacuated to shelters as a result of the flooding. A total of 86 homes were destroyed and 430 others were damaged. Furthermore, damage to private property totaled $7.58 million (1988 USD). In addition, the storm caused $3.8 million in damage to agriculture. Overall, the nation suffered $11.38 million damage due to the cyclone.

Even though the storm had weakened drastically by this time, Tess killed 37 people in Vietnam, destroyed thousands of homes, and inflicted $11 million in damage. Following Tess, Philippine President Corazon Aquino visited the provinces of Pangasinan and Pampanga, both situated to the north of Manila to tour damaged areas, distribute relief, aid and inaugurate an infrastructure project. A mere few days after Tess, Typhoon Skip became the third cyclone to hit the archipelago in two weeks.

See also

Other tropical cyclones named Tess
Tropical Storm Usagi (2018)

Notes

References

External links
 Japan Meteorological Agency
 Joint Typhoon Warning Center 

Western Pacific severe tropical storms
Typhoons in the Philippines
1988 disasters in the Philippines
1988 Pacific typhoon season
Typhoons in Vietnam
Tess